Kaafi Thota is a 2017 Indian romantic thriller Kannada film written, directed and co-produced by T. N. Seetharam. Adapting a crowd-funding methodology, Seetharam produced the film along with 29 other donors under the maiden banner "Manvanthara Films".

The film stars Raghu Mukherjee, Radhika Chetan and Samyukta Hornad in the lead roles along with Rahul Madhav, B. C. Patil, Achyuth Kumar, Sudha Belawadi and Sundar Raj in key supporting roles. The film score is by Mithun Mukundan and Anoop Seelin and the cinematography is by Ashok Kashyap. The film was officially launched on 9 December 2016.

The project marks the comeback of T. N. Seetharam to the big screen after his earlier directorial Meera Madhava Raghava. The trailer was launched on 6 August 2017 by actor Yash in Bangalore. The film was released on 18 August 2017.

Plot 
Chami (Rahul Madhav), a travelling musician who is a bit of a wanderlust, arrives at a palatial coffee estate owned by Mythili (Radhika Chetan), ostensibly on vacation. He is fond of Mythili's niece Pranjali, and grows close to the members of her extended family as well, who manage the homestay for Mythili. He conveys his love to Mythili, who is reluctant to accept his proposal, since a failed relationship with her lawyer Niranjan (Raghu Mukherjee) had caused her immense heartbreak in the past. However, despite her misgivings, she agrees to marry Chami.

On a night when the staff members of the homestay are on leave, Mythili is found murdered with trauma injuries to her head. The shadow of suspicion immediately falls upon Chami who was the only person present at the crime scene. Chami implores Niranjan to defend his case, which he does. Niranjan's sound arguments result in Chami being acquitted of the murder charge and him inheriting the estate. However, after examining the evidence, Niranjan soon discovers that Chami had planned and executed several murders to snap up the inheritances of young women who died heirless. He decides to appeal against his own arguments and requests a re-trial. Eyewitness evidence proffered by Pranjali, who was clandestinely present when Chami brutally murdered Mythili clinch the case in the favour of the prosecution. Chami is convicted of murder and sentenced to life imprisonment, while ownership of the estate passes on to Pranjali.

Cast

 Raghu Mukherjee as Niranjan 
 Radhika Chetan as Mythili 
 Samyukta Hornad as Tanvi
 Rahul Madhav as Chami
 Apeksha Purohit as Inspector Chanchala Kumari
 B. C. Patil as Police Commissioner 
 Rajesh Nataranga as Public prosecutor 
 Ambika as Judge
 Sudha Belawadi
 Sundar Raj as Chiranjeevi 
 T. N. Seetharam
 Veena Sundar as Meera
 Hanumanthegowda
 Krishnamurthy Srinath
 Diganteshwara S

Soundtrack

The original soundtrack for the film is composed by Anoop Seelin and Mithun Mukundan. Both have composed one song each and an additional track is penned by Yogaraj Bhat. Actor Puneeth Rajkumar launched the audio officially in Bangalore under the JP Music audio label.

References

External links
 

2017 films
2010s Kannada-language films
2010s romantic thriller films
Indian romantic thriller films
Films scored by Anoop Seelin
Films directed by T. N. Seetharam